Andrena cornelli, the azalea miner, is a species of mining bee in the family Andrenidae. It is found in North America. The only bee species oligolectic on azalea (Rhododendron spp.) with widely spaced scopa hairs that can carry the type of pollen of these plants.

References

cornelli
Insects described in 1907
Articles created by Qbugbot
Hymenoptera of North America